Tire balance, also called tire unbalance or tire imbalance, describes the distribution of mass within an automobile tire or the entire wheel (including the rim) on which it is mounted.

When the wheel rotates, asymmetries in its mass distribution may cause it to apply periodic forces and torques to the axle, which can cause ride disturbances, usually as vertical and lateral vibrations, and this may also cause the steering wheel to oscillate. The frequency and magnitude of this ride disturbance usually increases with speed, and vehicle suspensions may become excited when the rotating frequency of the wheel equals the resonant frequency of the suspension.

Tire balance is measured in factories and repair shops by two methods: with static balancers and with dynamic balancers. Tires with large unbalances are downgraded or rejected. When tires are fitted to wheels at the point of sale, they are measured again on a balancing machine, and correction weights are applied to counteract their combined unbalance. Tires may be rebalanced if driver perceives excessive vibration. Tire balancing is distinct from wheel alignment.

Static balance

Static balance requires the wheel center of mass to be located on its axis of rotation, usually at the center of the axle on which it is mounted. Static balance can be measured by a static balancing machine where the tire is placed on a vertical, non-rotating spindle. If the center of mass of the tire is not located on this vertical axis, then gravity will cause the axis to deflect. The amount of deflection indicates the magnitude of the unbalance, and the orientation of the deflection indicates the angular location of the unbalance. In tire manufacturing factories, static balancers use sensors mounted to the spindle assembly. In tire retail shops, static balancers are usually non-rotating bubble balancers, where the magnitude and angle of the unbalance is indicated by the center bubble in an oil-filled glass sighting gauge. While some very small shops that lack specialized machines still do this process, they have been largely replaced in larger shops with machines.

Dynamic balance
Dynamic balance requires that a principal axis of the tire's moment of inertia be aligned with the axis about which the tire rotates, usually the axle on which it is mounted. In the tire factory, the tire and wheel are mounted on a balancing machine test wheel, the assembly is rotated at 100 RPM (10 to 15 mph with recent high sensitivity sensors) or higher, 300 RPM (55 to 60 mph with typical low sensitivity sensors), and forces of unbalance are measured by sensors. These forces are resolved into static and couple values for the inner and outer planes of the wheel, and compared to the unbalance tolerance (the maximum allowable manufacturing limits). If the tire is not checked, it has the potential to cause vibration in the suspension of the vehicle on which it is mounted. In tire retail shops, tire/wheel assemblies are checked on a spin-balancer, which determines the amount and angle of unbalance. Balance weights are then fitted to the outer and inner flanges of the wheel.

Although dynamic balance is theoretically better than static balance, because both dynamic and static imbalances can be measured and corrected, its effectiveness is disputed because of the flexible nature of the rubber. A tire in a free spinning machine may not experience the same centrifugal distortion, heat distortion, nor weight and camber that it would on a vehicle. Dynamic balancing may therefore create new unintended imbalances.

Dynamic balancing has traditionally required removing the wheel from the vehicle, but sensors installed in modern cars, such as for anti-lock brakes, could enable estimating the imbalance while driving.

Physics 
To a first approximation, which neglects deformations due to its elasticity, the wheel is a rigid rotor that is constrained to rotate about its axle. If a principal axis of the wheel's moment of inertia is not aligned with the axle, due to an asymmetric mass distribution, then an external torque, perpendicular to the axle, is necessary to force the wheel to rotate about the axle. This additional torque must be provided by the axle and its orientation rotates continuously with the wheel. The reaction to this torque, by Newton's Third Law is applied to the axle, which transfers it to the suspension and can cause it to vibrate. Automotive technicians can reduce this vibration to an acceptable level when balancing the wheel by adding small masses to the inner and outer wheel rims that bring the principal axis into alignment with the axle.

Vehicle vibration
Vibration in automobiles may occur for many reasons, such as wheel unbalance, imperfect tire or wheel shape, brake pulsation, and worn or loose driveline, suspension, or steering components. Foreign material, such as road tar, stones, ice, or snow, that is stuck in a tire's tread or otherwise adhered to the tire or wheel may also cause a temporary unbalance and subsequent vibration.

Environmental consequences
Every year, millions of small weights are attached to wheels by automotive technicians balancing them. Traditionally, these weights have been made of lead; it is estimated that up to 500,000 pounds of lead, having fallen off car wheels, ended up in the environment. According to the US Environmental Protection Agency, worldwide these total more than 20,000 tonnes of lead annually, and therefore the use of less-toxic materials is encouraged. In Europe, lead weights have been banned since 2005; in the US, some states have also banned them. Alternatives are weights made of lead alloys that include zinc or copper, or weights that are altogether lead-free. In addition, internal tire balancing products are a feasible alternative to tire balancing. They are products which are inserted into the tire when it is mounted to the rim, thus, eliminating the use of hammer-on weights or tape weights.

See also
 Speed wobble
 Rotordynamics

References

Tires
Vehicle technology